Petrophila is a genus of moths of the family Crambidae. The genus was described by Lansdown Guilding in 1830.

Species
Petrophila aealis (Walker, 1859)
Petrophila aeglesalis (Walker, 1859)
Petrophila aengusalis (Schaus, 1924)
Petrophila albulalis (Hampson, 1906)
Petrophila alvealis (C. Felder, R. Felder & Rogenhofer, 1875)
Petrophila amethystina (Schaus, 1912)
Petrophila anna (Solis & Tuskes, 2018)
Petrophila annulalis (Guenée, 1854)
Petrophila argyrolepta (Dyar, 1914)
Petrophila argyrophora (Hampson, 1917)
Petrophila aroalis (Schaus, 1924)
Petrophila auspicatalis (Schaus, 1912)
Petrophila avernalis (Grote, 1878)
Petrophila axis (Hampson, 1895)
Petrophila aztecalis (Schaus, 1924)
Petrophila bedealis (Schaus, 1924)
Petrophila benezetalis (Schaus, 1924)
Petrophila bifascialis (Robinson, 1869)
Petrophila bijonalis (Dyar, 1914)
Petrophila brunneodora (Dyar, 1914)
Petrophila cabimalis (Dyar, 1914)
Petrophila canadensis (Munroe, 1972)
Petrophila cappsi (Lange, 1956)
Petrophila cathanalis (Schaus, 1924)
Petrophila cerrussalis (C. Felder, R. Felder & Rogenhofer, 1875)
Petrophila chejelalis (Schaus, 1924)
Petrophila chrysopalis (Hampson, 1906)
Petrophila climacusalis (Schaus, 1924)
Petrophila complicatalis (Dyar, 1914:)
Petrophila conallalis (Schaus, 1924)
Petrophila confusalis (Walker, 1866)
Petrophila constellalis (Hampson, 1897)
Petrophila cornvillia (Solis & Tuskes, 2018)
Petrophila cronialis (Druce, 1896)
Petrophila cyloialis (Schaus, 1906)
Petrophila daemonalis (Dyar, 1907)
Petrophila danaealis (Hampson, 1906)
Petrophila darsanialis (Druce, 1896)
Petrophila dialitha (Dyar, 1914)
Petrophila doriscalis (Schaus, 1940)
Petrophila esperanzalis (Schaus, 1924)
Petrophila flavivittalis (Hampson, 1917)
Petrophila fluviatilis Guilding, 1830
Petrophila fulicalis (Clemens, 1860)
Petrophila gemmiferalis (Lederer, 1863)
Petrophila glycysalis (Dyar, 1914)
Petrophila gordianalis (Schaus, 1924)
Petrophila gratalis (Walker, 1866)
Petrophila guadarensis (Schaus, 1906)
Petrophila hamiferalis (Hampson, 1906)
Petrophila heppneri A. Blanchard & Knudson, 1983
Petrophila herminalis (Schaus, 1906)
Petrophila hodgesi (Munroe, 1972)
Petrophila inaurata (Stoll in Cramer & Stoll, 1781)
Petrophila insulalis (Walker, 1862)
Petrophila iolepta (Dyar, 1914)
Petrophila jalapalis (Schaus, 1906)
Petrophila jaliscalis (Schaus, 1906)
Petrophila kearfottalis (Barnes & McDunnough, 1917)
Petrophila laurentialis (Schaus, 1924)
Petrophila leucistis (Dognin, 1906)
Petrophila longipennis (Hampson, 1906)
Petrophila lulesalis (Schaus, 1924)
Petrophila maguilalis (Schaus, 1924)
Petrophila malcusalis (Schaus, 1924)
Petrophila maronialis (Schaus, 1924)
Petrophila mignonalis (Dyar, 1914)
Petrophila multipicta (Dyar, 1914)
Petrophila niphoplagalis (Hampson, 1897)
Petrophila odoalis (Schaus, 1924)
Petrophila opulentalis (Lederer, 1863)
Petrophila pantheralis (Walker, 1859)
Petrophila parvissimalis (Schaus, 1912)
Petrophila pavonialis (Hampson, 1897)
Petrophila peraltalis (Schaus, 1912)
Petrophila phaeopastalis (Hampson, 1917)
Petrophila premalis (Druce, 1895)
Petrophila pyropalis (Guenée, 1854)
Petrophila santafealis (Heppner, 1976)
Petrophila schaefferalis (Dyar, 1906)
Petrophila schistopalis (Hampson, 1906)
Petrophila schwarzalis (Schaus, 1924)
Petrophila sumptuosalis (Möschler, 1890)
Petrophila tessimalis (Dyar, 1926)
Petrophila tristalis (Schaus, 1912)
Petrophila triumphalis (Schaus, 1912)
Petrophila ulfridalis (Schaus, 1924)
Petrophila unilinealis (Dyar, 1914)
Petrophila valstanalis (Schaus, 1924)
Petrophila zamoralis (Schaus, 1924)
Petrophila zelota (Dyar, 1914)

Former species
Petrophila aclistalis Dyar, 1914
Petrophila divisalis (Walker, 1866)

References

 , 1976: Synopsis of the genus Parargyractis (Lepidoptera: Pyralidae: Nymphulinae) in Florida [Insects]. The Florida Entomologist, 59 (1): 5-19.
 , 1956: A generic revision of the aquatic moths of North America: (Lepidoptera: Pyralidae, Nymphulinae). Wasman Journal of Biology, San Francisco 14  (1): 59–144.
 , 2018: Two New Species of Petrophila Guilding (Lepidoptera: Crambidae) from Northcentral Arizona, U.S.A.. Proceedings of the Entomological Society of Washington, 120: 593–604.

External links
Crambidae genus list at Butterflies and Moths of the World of the Natural History Museum

 
Acentropinae
Crambidae genera